The women's 12.5 km mass start competition at the Biathlon World Championships 2023 was held on 19 February 2023.

Results
The race was started at 15:15.

References

Women's mass start